Timlovirales is an order of viruses, which infect prokaryotes. Most of these bacteriophages were discovered by metagenomics.

Taxonomy
Timlovirales contains the following two families:
 Blumeviridae
 Steitzviridae

References

Virus orders
Riboviria